The term isostatic may refer to:
 
Isostatic depression in geodynamics
Isostatic powder compaction in metallurgy and ceramic engineering
Isostatic press in manufacturing

See also 
Isostasy in geology: gravitational equilibrium between the earth's lithosphere and asthenosphere
Statically determinate structures in physics and engineering